Hadhagaala or Adigala is a small town in north-eastern Ethiopia. It is served by a station on the narrow gauge Ethio-Djibouti Railways. The railway reached Adigale in 1902. The station is about 100 km inside Ethiopia from the border with Djibouti.

Demographics
As of 2012, the population of Hadigale has been estimated to be 60,702. The town's inhabitants belong to mainly Afro-Asiatic-speaking Somali, with the Issa Somali predominant.

Water Pipeline
The town is the base for the Chinese funded Ethiopia-Djibouti cross border potable water project. The water project is funded by the Exim bank of China and is constructed by Chinese company CGCOC. The project is expected to launch towards the end of 2017 and will supply groundwater to the Djibouti towns of Ali Sabieh, Dikhil, Arta and Djibouti City.

See also
Railway stations in Ethiopia

References

Populated places in the Somali Region